Mahatma Gandhi Memorial Medical College may refer to:
 Mahatma Gandhi Memorial Medical College, Indore
 Mahatma Gandhi Memorial Medical College, Jamshedpur